What Every Girl Should Know may refer to:

 "What Every Girl Should Know" (song), a song by Robert Wells
 What Every Girl Should Know (album), a 1959 album by Doris Day
 What Every Girl Should Know (film), a 1927 American romance film